Sir John Ernest Michael Conant, 2nd Baronet (born 24 April 1923), is a British aristocrat.

Biography
The eldest son of the first baronet and a member of the senior branch of the Conant family, he was educated at Eton and Corpus Christi College, Cambridge. During the Second World War, he served with the Grenadier Guards, receiving an emergency commission as a second lieutenant on 4 December 1942, with promotion to war-substantive lieutenant on 6 April 1943. He served as High Sheriff of Rutland in 1960.

References

1923 births
Living people
British Army personnel of World War II
Conant family
Baronets in the Baronetage of the United Kingdom
People from Rutland
Military personnel from Rutland
People educated at Eton College